The Afro-Arab Volleyball Friendship Cup (Arabic: بطولة الصداقة العربية الأفريقية للكرة الطائرة), is a volleyball competition which was held between Arab and African countries, and was organized by the Arab Volleyball Association. It started in 1981, and was discontinued after this edition.

Results

External links

 Afro-Arab Friendship Cup (Kuwait Olympic Committee)

 
International volleyball competitions
Volleyball in the Arab world